Under the Influence of Bad People is an album by Screw 32, released in 1997 on  Fat Wreck Chords.

Track listing

My Crazy Life
Misunderstood
Broken
Something You Said
Don't Let Them Take You Alive
Black Marker
Paint the Town Red
Sick to Death
Sticks and Stones
Painless
One Time Angels
Responsibility

References 

1997 albums
Fat Wreck Chords albums
Albums produced by Ryan Greene